Epander was one of the Indo-Greek kings. He may have been a relative of Menander I, and the findplaces of his coins seem to indicate that he ruled in the area of Punjab.

Time of reign
Bopearachchi dates Epander to c. 95–90 BC and R. C. Senior to c. 80 BC. The scarcity of his coins indicate that his reign was short and/or his territory limited.

Coins of Epander
Epander's silver drachms portray the king in diadem with a reverse of Athena fighting which was the type of Menander I. Epander probably claimed ancestry from this important king, but his epithet Nikephoros (Victorious) was unique to kings using this reverse: their title was usually Soter (Saviour). He struck no Attic (monolingual) coins.

Overstrikes
Epander overstruck coins of Strato I and Philoxenus.

See also
 Greco-Bactrian Kingdom
 Seleucid Empire
 Greco-Buddhism
 Indo-Scythians
 Indo-Parthian Kingdom
 Kushan Empire

References
 The Greeks in Bactria and India, W.W. Tarn, Cambridge University Press.

External links
Coins of Epander
Le Roi Epandre le Victorieux

Indo-Greek kings
1st-century BC rulers in Asia